Amini Tuitavake Britteon Fonua (born 14 December 1989) is a Tongan competitive swimmer.

Career 
Fonua's swimming career began at the Roskill Swimming Club based at Cameron Pool in Auckland, coached by Sandra Burrow from 1999–2007.  He broke numerous Auckland and New Zealand Age Group Records under Burrow's tenure. He then moved to West Auckland Aquatics in 2007, and was coached by Donna Bouzaid.  In the Fall of 2008, Fonua enrolled at Texas A&M on a swimming scholarship.  While at Texas A&M he was a peer voted Team Captain, Big XII Conference Champion, NCAA All-American, and recipient of The Aggie Heart Award.  He graduated with a Telecommunication and Multi-Media degree, with a Minor in Creative Writing in May 2013.

He was "the first Tongan swimmer to win a gold medal in international competition", when he took gold in the 50 metre breaststroke at the 2010 Oceania Swimming Championships.

In preparation for the 2012 London Olympics Fonua was trained by New Zealander and designated head coach for Tonga, Jon Winter. He served as his nation's flag-bearer in the 2012 Summer Olympics Parade of Nations. As a swimmer at the 2012 Summer Olympics, he competed in the Men's 100 metre breaststroke, failing to reach the semifinals.

Fonua made an international comeback at the 2015 Pacific Games in Port Moresby, Papua New Guinea. He created history by becoming the first ever Tongan athlete to ever win three gold medals at a Pacific Games by sweeping the Breaststroke events, setting two Games Records in the process (50 m and 100 m Breaststroke).  He is the only Tongan athlete in history to ever hold dual Oceania and Pacific Games titles.

At the 2016 Olympics, he again competed in the 100 m breaststroke.

Personal life 
Fonua was born and raised in Ponsonby, Auckland, New Zealand to Tongan lawyer Sione Fonua and British-born mother Julie. He holds dual Tongan and New Zealand citizenship. His family includes two sisters.

Fonua is openly gay and a vocal advocate for LGBT rights.

He enjoys soursop fruit.

References

External links
 

1989 births
Living people
Olympic swimmers of Tonga
Male breaststroke swimmers
Swimmers at the 2012 Summer Olympics
Swimmers at the 2016 Summer Olympics
Texas A&M Aggies men's swimmers
Gay sportsmen
New Zealand LGBT sportspeople
Tongan LGBT sportspeople
LGBT swimmers
New Zealand people of British descent
New Zealand sportspeople of Tongan descent
Swimmers from Auckland
Swimmers at the 2020 Summer Olympics
21st-century LGBT people